Adam Dugdale (born 12 September 1987) is a retired English footballer who played as a defender

Career
Liverpool-born Dugdale, is a product of Crewe Alexandra's youth academy, playing one first team game before being released in 2007. He then played in non-league with Southport, Droylsden, Barrow and AFC Telford, before rejoining Crewe on 23 June 2010, signing an initial six-month deal.

Dugdale signed for Tranmere Rovers on a one-month emergency loan deal on 30 August 2013. Some 16 months later, in January 2015, after over 100 league appearances for Crewe, he rejoined Rovers on a six-month deal. At the end of the season, that saw Tranmere Rovers relegate out of League Two, Dugdale was released by the club.

Following Dugdale's release from Tranmere, he signed for a League Two side Morecambe on a one-year deal.

Dugdale joined Eastleigh in June 2016. He left the club a year later by mutual consent.

Honours
with Crewe Alexandra
Football League Two play-off Final winner: 2012

References

External links

1987 births
Living people
English footballers
Association football defenders
Crewe Alexandra F.C. players
Accrington Stanley F.C. players
Southport F.C. players
Droylsden F.C. players
Barrow A.F.C. players
Hyde United F.C. players
AFC Telford United players
Tranmere Rovers F.C. players
Morecambe F.C. players
Eastleigh F.C. players
Footballers from Liverpool